Ozero-Kureyevo (Kürey köl) is a rural locality (a selo) in Ozero-Kureyevskoye Rural Settlement of Turochaksky District, the Altai Republic, Russia. The population was 384 as of 2016. There are 8 streets.

Geography 
Ozero-Kureyevo is located on the right bank of the Biya River, 46 km northwest of Turochak (the district's administrative centre) by road. Turbaza Kureyevskaya is the nearest rural locality.

References 

Rural localities in Turochaksky District